Stardust is a 2006 miniseries produced for RTÉ by Brackside Merlin Films. The first episode surrounds the night a fire broke out at the Stardust Disco in North Dublin on 14 February 1981, in which 48 people died. The second episode depicts the search for answers and justice by families and survivors. It was screened over two nights on the 25th anniversary of the incident in 2006. It was shortlisted for best miniseries at the 2006 Monte-Carlo Television Festival. The relatives of some victims were against its production.

References

External links
IMDb Profile

2006 Irish television series debuts
2006 Irish television series endings
Irish television soap operas
RTÉ original programming
Television shows set in the Republic of Ireland
Television series set in 1981